Giorgio Miceli (21 October 1836 in Reggio Calabria – 1895, Italy) was an Italian opera composer who played mandolin and wrote music for the instrument.

He was the composer for the operetta Zoe and for the music A Grand Serenade for Mandolin Band. He wrote other works for both the mandolin and the guitar, as well as for other instruments.

His son Giuseppe Miceli was also a successful performer and composer for the mandolin, including Danza Zingaresca for mandolin with piano accompaniment.

Family history
Giorgio Miceli was a son of well-off parents, who participated in the Italian revolution of 1847. His father was sentenced to row in the galleys as punishment, and Giorgio was sent to Naples. He had begun to learn mandolin from his uncle when he was seven-years old, and in Naples, he continued to study music under Gallo and under Giuseppe Lillo at the Naples Conservatory.

His operetta Zoe, performed in 1852, was his first; he was only 16. Zoe was given in 40 performances, and he had a second opera the next year which performed similarly. His plays were banned by the Naples authorities and he became a teacher. He continued to play, entering musical competitions in Naples and Florence. His work A Grand Serenade for Mandolin Band, done for the Maritime Exhibition in Naples did well, and he was knighted as a result in 1875.

Operas
The 1910 book Dictionary-Catalogue of Operas and Operettas which Have Been Performed on the Public Stage: Libretti listed Miceli and some of his works:
 Zoe
 Amanti sessagenarli
 Conte di Rossiglione
 Convito di Baldassare
 Fata
 Feodora
 Fidanzata
 Jefte
 (La figlia di) Leggenda di Pisa
 Rapimento
 Serena
 Somnambule

References

Italian opera composers
Male opera composers
19th-century classical composers
Italian mandolinists
Italian classical composers
Italian male classical composers
Musicians from Naples
People from Reggio Calabria
1836 births
1895 deaths
19th-century Italian composers
19th-century Italian male musicians